Lizzette Kattan, is a Honduran-born fashion editor that worked between Milan and New York from 1976 until 1986 for Harper's Bazaar Italy, Harper's Bazaar France, Uomo Harper's Bazaar and Italian Cosmopolitan. She collaborated with virtually every major photographer of that period and discovered many of today's most recognizable photographic talent. Once retired from the fashion world Kattan started her diplomatic career as the Commercial Attache of the Honduran Embassy in Rome, in 1990, and eventually becoming the Consulate General of Milan in 2002 until 2007. She currently works as a freelance Stylist for international publications.

Kattan is fluent in English, French, Italian, and Spanish.

Early life 
Kattan was born in San Pedro Sula, Honduras. Her family relocated to New York City while in her teens. Her passion throughout her childhood was not fashion but oddly enough archeology. And thus she pursued a degree in anthropology at Hunter College. Eileen Ford discovered Kattan on the streets of New York and proposed to her to become a model. The decision to start a modeling career was met with some hesitation, as Kattan never considered working in the fashion industry.

Career

Fashion career
Kattan signed with Ford Models and started working in New York City. She traveled throughout Europe and worked for the likes of GQ, ELLE France, Italian Vogue and Harper's Bazaar Italia.

Her interest of being in front of camera waned during her short modeling career and she gradually pursued a job at Edizioni Syds, which owned Harper's Bazaar Italia. She began her career organizing photo shoots for Italian Cosmopolitan. Her big break came in 1976 when she took over as the Fashion Director of Italian Cosmopolitan, a position she held until 1986.

Her powerful creative work gained momentum and she took over as the Fashion Director of Harper's Bazaar Italia in 1978. Her greatest accomplishment was launching Men's Harper's Bazaar in 1979. The magazine was later renamed Harper's Bazaar Uomo. She fostered many close ties with the greatest talents of that period such as Valentino, Gianni Versace, Ottavio Missoni and Calvin Klein.

She aggressively pursued some of the best photographic talent in the industry collaborating on projects with Chris von Wangenheim, Albert Watson, Arthur Elgort and Patrick Demarchelier. Her most notable assets was discovering young photographers and allowing them to develop their talent. This opportunity gave way to some of the most recognizable names of today such as Herb Ritts and Steven Meisel. Meisel, an illustrator working at Women's Wear Daily, would later become synonymous with Italian – and American Vogue. During the same time she met and launched Gia Carangi's career booking her for back to back shoots for Harper's Bazaar Italia with photographer Chris von Wangenheim.

In 1983 Harper's Bazaar France opened its doors in Paris with Kattan as the Editor-in-chief, a position she held until December 1985.

Kattan retired from her positions at Harper's Bazaar in 1986 to raise her two sons.

Diplomatic career
In 1990 Kattan became the commercial attaché of the Honduran Embassy in Rome. She was responsible for various publications attracting foreign investment from Italy. In 2002 Kattan became the Consul general of Honduras in Milan, which serviced the region of Lombardy and Venice. This post was held until 2007.

In effort to promote the country of Honduras, Kattan created a quarterly publication called "Honduran Highlights"   which highlighted culture, tourism and investment opportunities. The publication existed from 1990 to 2007.

Kattan created the concept and help organize two museum exhibits in Europe. "Les Mayas au pays de Copan" was held at the Abbaye de Daoulas from 5 April and 7 September 1997. "I Maya di Copan – L'atene del Centro America" was exhibited at the Palazzo Reale in Milan from 3 October 1997 to 1 March 1998.

References

External links
 

Harper's Bazaar
Italian women editors
Italian magazine editors
Fashion journalists
French magazine editors
Living people
People from New York City
Diplomats from Milan
1951 births
Fashion editors
French women journalists
Honduran women journalists
Honduran emigrants to the United States
French women writers
French women editors
Women magazine editors